Juhi Parmar (born 14 December 1980) is an Indian anchor, actress, presenter, singer and dancer predominantly known for her work in Hindi television industry. She gained recognition for her portrayal as Kumkum in the long-running soap opera Kumkum – Ek Pyara Sa Bandhan (2002–09) and that of Sangya and Chhaya in Karmaphal Daata Shani. She then won the reality show Bigg Boss 5 (2011–12).

Career

Parmar debuted into Hindi television as Samidha in Zee TV's 1998 series Woh.

After a short break, she began the next century of 2000s with Sony Entertainment Television's Choodiyan. It featured her as Meghna, a caring and lovely sister who lost her mother in a horrific accident. Her first titular protagonistic role was in Shaheen. The same year she appeared in Yeh Jeevan Hai and first season of Rishtey. In 2001, she was cast in the second season of Rishtey and ventured into Gujarati cinema with Rangai Jaane Rangma followed by her Hindi foraying with Madhur Milan.

The most beneficial break and major popularity for Parmar came in 2002, when she took on the titular lead part of Kumkum opposite Hussain Kuwajerwala in Kumkum — Ek Pyara Sa Bandhan, a long-running soap opera that aired on Star Plus. Her performance as Kumkum made her a household name and was awarded with Best Actress (Critics) at Indian Telly Awards. One of the most longest-running Indian television series, it wrapped up in 2009 after a successful run of continuously seven years.

Simultaneously alongside Kumkum, Parmar also did appearances in several other commitments.

In 2003, Parmar won The Miss Rajasthan beauty pageant. She started her career with television serial Woh on Zee TV. Her biggest break came when she became a household name for her portrayal as Kumkum in Star Plus's Indian soap opera Kumkum – Ek Pyara Sa Bandhan opposite Hussain Kuwajerwala for which she also won the Best Actress (Critics) at the Indian Telly Awards in 2005. Juhi participated and became a finalist in the reality shows Say Shava Shava and Saas v/s Bahu. She also became the winner of Comedy Circus.

In October 2011, Juhi was a contestant in the fifth season of the Indian version of the reality TV show Big Brother, Bigg Boss. She survived for full 14 weeks and became the winner of the show In January 2012.

She was also seen in a cameo role in &TV's popular mythological Drama Series Santoshi Maa along with her then husband Sachin Shroff and was seen in another successful mythological show Shani from 2016 to 2018.

She was last seen on Colors TV show Tantra where she made her debut in the supernatural genre.

Personal life
Parmar was originally from a Rajasthani background. She married Sindhi businessman and actor Sachin Shroff on 15 February 2009 at a palace in Jaipur. The couple have a daughter, Samaira Shroff, born on 27 January 2013.

In early January 2018, Parmar confirmed that they had recently filed for divorce. After several months of arguing, the couple were granted a divorce in July 2018. Parmar was granted custody of their daughter.

Filmography

Television

Film

References

External links 
 
 

1980 births
Living people
20th-century Indian actresses
Indian television actresses
Female models from Madhya Pradesh
Indian women television presenters
Indian television presenters
Reality show winners
Rajasthani people
Bigg Boss (Hindi TV series) contestants
Big Brother (franchise) winners
Actors from Mumbai